Kunwargaon is a town and a nagar panchayat in Badaun district in the Indian state of Uttar Pradesh.

Demographics
 India census, Kunwargaon had a population of 8,053. Where 4320 are males and 3733 are female as per Census India 2011 report. Kunwargaon has an average literacy rate of 46%, lower than the national average of 59.5%: male literacy is 56%, and female literacy is 35%. In Kunwargaon, 19% of the population is under 6 years of age.

References

Cities and towns in Budaun district